John T. Reitz is an American re-recording mixer. He won an Oscar for Best Sound and was nominated for another four in the same category. He has worked on more than 180 films since 1976.

Selected filmography
Reitz won an Academy Award for Best Sound and was nominated for another four in the same category:

Won
 The Matrix (1999)

Nominated
 Days of Heaven (1978)
 The Perfect Storm (2000)
 Flags of Our Fathers (2006)
 Argo (2012)
 American Sniper (2014)

References

External links
 

Year of birth missing (living people)
Living people
American audio engineers
Best Sound Mixing Academy Award winners
Best Sound BAFTA Award winners
Emmy Award winners